Pamela Cothran Marsh (born July 29, 1965) is an American attorney who served as the United States Attorney for the Northern District of Florida from 2010 to 2015. She currently teaches criminal law at the University of Florida.

References

1965 births
Living people
United States Attorneys for the Northern District of Florida
Florida Democrats
American women lawyers
Georgetown University alumni
Georgetown University Law Center alumni
People from Atlanta
People associated with Jenner & Block
21st-century American women